Lamprologus is a genus of fishes from the cichlid family. They are native to Lake Tanganyika (where several species are shell dwellers) and the Congo River Basin in Africa. The type species for this genus is Lamprologus congoensis, a species from the Congo River. The genus is under some revision and may eventually be restricted to these riverine types.

Species
There are currently 20 recognized species in this genus:

 Lamprologus callipterus Boulenger, 1906 
 Lamprologus congoensis Schilthuis, 1891
 Lamprologus finalimus Nichols & La Monte, 1931
 Lamprologus kungweensis Poll, 1956
 Lamprologus laparogramma I. R. Bills & Ribbink, 1997
 Lamprologus lemairii Boulenger, 1899
 Lamprologus lethops T. R. Roberts & D. J. Stewart, 1976
 Lamprologus markerti Tougas & Stiassny, 2014  
 Lamprologus meleagris Büscher, 1991
 Lamprologus mocquardi Pellegrin, 1903
 Lamprologus ocellatus (Steindachner, 1909)
 Lamprologus ornatipinnis Poll, 1949
 Lamprologus signatus Poll, 1952
 Lamprologus speciosus Büscher, 1991
 Lamprologus stappersi Pellegrin, 1927
 Lamprologus symoensi Poll, 1976
 Lamprologus teugelsi Schelly & Stiassny, 2004
 Lamprologus tigripictilis Schelly & Stiassny, 2004
 Lamprologus tumbanus Boulenger, 1899
 Lamprologus werneri Poll, 1959

References

 
Lamprologini
Cichlid genera